Durita Hummeland (born 21 March 1998) is a Faroese footballer who plays as a midfielder and has appeared for the Faroe Islands women's national team.

Career
Hummeland has been capped for the Faroe Islands national team, appearing for the team during the 2019 FIFA Women's World Cup qualifying cycle.

References

External links
 
 
 

1998 births
Living people
Faroese women's footballers
Faroe Islands women's international footballers
Women's association football midfielders